Talang 2011 was the fifth season of the talent show Talang, the Swedish version of Got Talent. Both Bert Karlsson and Charlotte Perrelli returned as judges while Henrik Fexeus became the new third judge. The season featured eleven episodes and started broadcasting on 1 April 2011, with the final held on 10 June 2011. The season was won by speedcuber Simon Westlund. After the 2011 season, TV4 put the show on indefinite hiatus, until TV3 announced in June 2013 that they had acquired the rights for the show and would re-launch the show in Spring 2014 under the name "Talang Sverige".

Semi-finals Summary
In the semi-finals, it is only the viewers who vote until three favorites per semifinals. The talent with the most votes will go directly to the final. Then the jury will take which of the second and third to be able to go to the final.

 Judge Disapproved |  Judge Approved
 |  |

Semi-final 1

Semi-final 2

Semi-final 3

Final

References 

Talang (Swedish TV series)
2011 Swedish television seasons